Arippara is a genus of snout moths. It was described by Francis Walker in 1863.

Species
Arippara disticha (Turner, 1904)
Arippara eogenalis (Snellen, 1892)

References

Pyralini
Pyralidae genera